Tricolia miniata is a species of sea snail, a marine gastropod mollusk in the family Phasianellidae.

Description

Distribution
This species occurs in the Eastern Atlantic Ocean off Portugal, off the Strait of Gibraltar and in the Southern Mediterranean Sea, found on brown algae Cystoseira tamariscifolia (Hudson) Papenfuss, 1950.

References

 Gofas S. (1982). The genus Tricolia in the Eastern Atlantic and the Mediterranean. Journal of Molluscan Studies 48: 182–213
 Gofas, S.; Le Renard, J.; Bouchet, P. (2001). Mollusca, in: Costello, M.J. et al. (Ed.) (2001). European register of marine species: a check-list of the marine species in Europe and a bibliography of guides to their identification. Collection Patrimoines Naturels, 50: pp. 180–213

External links
 

Phasianellidae
Gastropods described in 1884